Benedetto de Pradosso (died 1432) was a Roman Catholic prelate who served as Bishop of Ravello (1418–1432) and Bishop of Capri (1398–1418).

Biography
On 10 December 1398, Benedetto de Pradosso was appointed during the papacy of Pope Martin V as Bishop of Capri.
On 16 February 1418, he was appointed during the papacy of Pope Eugene IV as Bishop of Ravello.
He served as Bishop of Ravello until his death in 1432. 
While bishop, he was the principal consecrator of Angelo Marcuzzi, Bishop of Telese o Cerreto Sannita (1413).

References

External links and additional sources
 (for Chronology of Bishops) 
 (for Chronology of Bishops) 
 (for Chronology of Bishops) 
 (for Chronology of Bishops)  

Bishops appointed by Pope Martin V
Bishops appointed by Pope Eugene IV
1432 deaths
People from Ravello
15th-century Italian Roman Catholic bishops